Frederick Martin (died 1932) was an English footballer who played as an inside right for South Kirkby, Barnsley, Sunderland and Raith Rovers

Playing career
Martin began his football career with South Kirkby before being signed by Barnsley in May 1909. He played at either inside right or centre forward for Barnsley. After three seasons at Oakwell he next moved to Sunderland in February 1913 and then to Raith Rovers. By April Martin found himself in the final of the Scottish Cup with Raith but ended up on the losing side. In 1914 Martin scored two goals for Raith Rovers in a Scottish Cup win over the then mighty Hearts, where he broke a tooth in doing so. His exploits for Raith led to him being heavily linked to a return to Sunderland or a transfer to Hearts or Celtic.

Martin died in January 1932 at the age of 43.

References

Year of birth missing
English footballers
Association football forwards
South Kirkby Colliery F.C. players
Barnsley F.C. players
Raith Rovers F.C. players
Sunderland A.F.C. players
1932 deaths